Antoine Warnier (born 24 June 1993) is a Belgian former professional road bicycle racer, who rode professionally between 2013 and 2018 for the  and  teams.

Career
Warnier held the mountain jersey for two days at the 2015 Tour de Wallonie. The following year, Warnier held the mountain jersey for one day and the youth jersey for two days at the 2016 Tour de Wallonie. In 2017, he competed in Liège–Bastogne–Liège, finishing in 119th place.

Major results

2014
 4th Grand Prix de la Ville de Lillers
 5th Paris–Tours Espoirs
 6th Overall Carpathian Couriers Race
 9th Piccolo Giro di Lombardia
2015
 5th Overall Tour de Wallonie
 7th Overall Paris–Arras Tour
1st  Young rider classification
2017
 4th Volta Limburg Classic
 5th Grand Prix de la ville de Nogent-sur-Oise
 10th Grand Prix de la Ville de Lillers
2018
 7th Volta Limburg Classic

References

External links

1993 births
Living people
Belgian male cyclists
Cyclists from Liège Province